The Bay Area Figurative Movement (also known as the Bay Area Figurative School, Bay Area Figurative Art, Bay Area Figuration, and similar variations) was a mid-20th Century art movement made up of a group of artists in the San Francisco Bay Area who abandoned working in the prevailing style of Abstract Expressionism in favor of a return to figuration in painting during the 1950s and onward into the 1960s.
Spanning two decades, this art movement is often broken down into three groups, or generations: the First Generation, the Bridge Generation, and the Second Generation.

Many of the "First Generation" artists in this movement were avid fans of Abstract Expressionism, and worked in that manner, until several of them abandoned non-objective painting in favor of working with the figure. Among these First Generation Bay Area Figurative School artists were: David Park, Richard Diebenkorn, Rex Ashlock, Elmer Bischoff, Glenn Wessels, Wayne Thiebaud, Raimonds Staprans, and James Weeks.

The "Bridge Generation" included the artists: Henrietta Berk, Nathan Oliveira, Theophilus Brown, Paul Wonner, Roland Petersen, John Hultberg, and Frank Lobdell.

Many "Second Generation" artists of this movement studied under the First Generation artists, or were late starters. Among these Second Generation artists were: Bruce McGaw, Henry Villierme, Joan Brown, Manuel Neri, and Robert Qualters.

Many Bay Area schools and institutions were important to the development and refinement of this art movement, including the San Francisco Art Institute, California College of Arts and Crafts, and the University of California, Berkeley.

First generation artists

David Park

David Park (1911-1960) was arguably the most important painter of the Bay Area Figurative Movement. Park was an Abstract Expressionist painter, based in San Francisco, and one of the first to move towards the figurative style of painting. In the spring of 1951, Park won a prize for a figurative canvas that he submitted to a competitive exhibition. Park's turn to figurative style baffled some of his colleagues, as at the time, abstract painting was the only way to go for progressive artists. His courageous effort to move away from abstract paintings to figure prompted a rise in figurative art which would go on to be one of the most important postwar developments on the West Coast.

Rather than going through a slow transformation from abstract paintings to figures, it is believed that Park's abstractions disappeared instantly. An interview with Park's aunt suggested that Park drove his abstract paintings to a dump and released or ritually destroyed them. His colleagues did not even know about this transformation until the following year.

In 2004, Hackett Freedman Gallery in San Francisco held an exhibition of 35 of David Park's works from 1953 to 1960. These were the works that marked the final years of his life and the exhibition was held to celebrate his life as well as his return to figure painting in 1950, which was instrumental in starting the Movement. Some of the earlier works in the exhibition suggest that Park responded to the art of Max Beckmann and his influence is particularly visible in "The Band" (1955). Over the years, Park's palette turned towards an ebullient chromaticism, but his carving approach to paint handling could be seen in his work throughout until finally he decided to give up oils in 1959.

Some of David Park's important works are "Mother in Law" (1954-1955)," Violin and Cello" (1939), "Torso" (1959), "Figure in Chair" (1960), etc.

Elmer Bischoff

Elmer Bischoff (1916-1991), in his late thirties and forties, had an extensive phase of what he called "Picassoesque mouthings". After returning from war in 1945, he felt impelled to challenge all the assumptions that he held about art as well as life. When asked about this in an interview, he said, “Until then art had been an external acquisition; [but now it] became more of a quest.” It was around this time that he was hired as a short-term replacement at the school of fine arts.

Just like his abstract work, Bischoff achieved great success with his early figurative works. Bischoff entered his painting "Figure and Red Wall" in the Fifth Annual Oil and Sculpture Exhibition at the Richmond Art Center and won the $200 first prize for it. This feat earned him a solo show at the Paul Kantor Gallery in Los Angeles. However, it was a one-person show of paintings and drawings in January 1956 at the California School of Fine Arts gallery that Bischoff believed had the biggest impact on his future.

Some of Bischoff's important works are Figure at window with Boat (1964), Playground (1954), The River (1953),

Richard Diebenkorn

Out of all the First Generation artists, it was Richard Diebenkorn (1922-1993) who took the biggest risk by turning to figuration in 1955. Diebenkorn was nationally recognized for his abstract work. James Johnson Sweeney's exhibition "Younger American Painters", resulted in his work was extensively shown by dealers in Los Angeles and Chicago. Along with his national reputation for his abstract work, Diebenkorn was also a beloved abstractionist among the locals in Sausalito.

After that he focused on figurative art but it was not until 1956 that he attempted complex figurative paintings. His earliest figurative works seemed to loosely be based on self-portraits. He returned to abstraction in the mid-1960s.

Some of Richard Diebenkorn's important works are Cityscape 1 (1963), Interior with Doorway (1962), etc.

Bridge generation artists

Theophilus Brown and Paul John Wonner

Theophilus Brown (1919-2012) and Paul John Wonner (1920-2008) both felt strongly influenced by the more established artists' work. In 1955, both Brown and Wonner rented studio spaces within the same building which was also the building where Diebenkorn worked. Diebenkorn, Bischoff and Park joined Brown and Wonner to hold life-drawing sessions. They were occasionally joined by James Weeks and Nathan Oliviera.

Wonner's figurative works were displayed in an exhibition held at the California School of Fine Arts gallery late in 1956. From the very beginning Wonner was committed to conventions of representation, and identified line as a firm descriptive boundary and edge. His 1956 works have figures cut horizontally which show more aggression than his previous works such as Glider.

Some of Brown's important works are Male Nude Seated (1960), Sun and Moon (1960), etc. while Wonner's important works are Side of the house, Malibu (1965), Mountain Near Tucson (1963), etc.

Roland Petersen 

In the 1960s, Roland Petersen embarked on his highly acclaimed Picnic series. With their saturated colors, thick layered pigment, and geometric compositions.
An active figure in the Bay Area art scene for over forty years, Petersen has taught generations of artists not only painting but also printmaking and photography. He lives in the Bay Area and continues to paint actively. Petersen's work has been exhibited in museums and galleries around the country, and is represented in major museum collections, including the Museum of Modern Art, New York City; Whitney Museum of American Art, New York City; San Francisco Museum of Modern Art; Hirshhorn Museum and Sculpture Garden, Washington, D.C.; Fine Arts Museums of San Francisco; and Philadelphia Museum of Art.

Nathan Oliveira

Nathan Oliveira (1928-2010) had a youthful interest in music which slowly faded away as he grew older. On his trip to M. H. de Young Memorial Museum, he decided to become a portrait painter. He later went on to serve in the army where he managed to keep up with his art scene. He did not consider himself avant-garde or part of a specific movement.

Oliveira's early figurative works tend to have more detail and color which can be seen in his Seated Man with Dog. His works completed in the San Leandro studio in 1959, in his own words, "became the very foundation of [his] whole identity as a painter in [his] country."

Some of Nathan's important works are Seated Man with Dog (1957), Man Walking (1958), Adolescent by the Bed (1959), etc.

Henrietta Berk
Henrietta Berk (1919–1990) painted mostly in oil. Her work was noted for its strong colors and shapes.Berk developed her own unique approach to art with daring use of color and unique interpretation of shape and light. Her work is remarkable considering the challenging times for female artists in the 1960s and the glass ceiling she fought so hard to break. Berk attended the California College of Arts and Crafts in Oakland from 1955 to 1959, where she studied with Richard Diebenkorn and Harry Krell. Some of Berk's most noted works are Me or Facade (1960), Picnic (1961), Golden Gate (1961), Three Figures (1962), Racing (1964), Leaning Figure (1967) Lagoon Valley Road (1968). 

A retrospective exhibit of her work opened at The Hilbert Museum at Chapman University June 13, 2020 in conjunction with a book on the artist, "In Living Color, The Art & Life of Henrietta Berk" edited by Cindy Johnson and published by Cool Titles.

Second generation artists

Bruce McGaw

Bruce McGaw was born in 1935 and was the only artist from the second generation to be included in the 1957 Contemporary Bay Area Figurative Painting exhibition. He studied at California College of Arts and Crafts and took one of the first classes taught by Diebenkorn in 1955. McGaw had a close relationship with Diebenkorn, who even met with McGaw's parents to show them his support for their son's works. McGaw also studied with Leon Goldin, where he worked with abstraction.

Figuration was not a furtive process for McGaw. Like other second-generation artists, he was not confined to any particular style and moved from one style to the other. One of McGaw's first mature figurative paintings clearly showed influences from Diebenkorn but McGaw also showed a lot of new features of his own. He liked working on a very small scale and broke the body into standard torso views or odd, synecdochal parts.

Some of McGaw's important works are "Abstraction" (1955), "Figure" (1957), "Patt's Feet" (1957), etc.

Joan Brown

Joan Brown created colorful, expansive paintings depicting her life and experiences in San Francisco, where she lived and worked in for nearly all her life.  Her time as a figurative artist was intense and productive and provided some of the most important works of the Movement. Brown earned a BFA and MFA from the California School of Fine Arts (which became the San Francisco Art Institute). It was there that she met a key mentor, artist Elmer Bischoff, and began gaining recognition for her paintings. In 1960, she was the youngest artist exhibited as part of Young America 1960 (Thirty American Painters Under Thirty-Six) at the Whitney Museum of American Art.

Some of Joan Brown's important works are Woman and Dog in Room with Chinese Rug (1975), Noel at the Table with a Large Bowl of Fruit (1963), etc.

Manuel Neri

Manuel Neri was a sculptor. Neri explored abstraction during the early stages of his career, like all the younger Bay Area Figurative artists. It was only after he left school in 1959 that he took up figuration. It allowed him to synthesize his interests in color and form and to play with the ambiguities of content. It is the non-specificity of his figures and their abstract qualities that make his sculptures part of the Bay Area Figurative Movement and not just any contemporary figurative sculpture in America.

Neri, only two years younger than Nathan Oliveira, had a similar childhood and like Oliveira had no interest in art as a kid. The only reason Neri took a course in ceramics in school was to lighten his load. His ceramics teacher was Roy Walker who encouraged him to pursue art further by taking advanced classes. Neri soon dropped his engineering classes and in 1951 started taking courses at the California College of Arts and Crafts, where he officially enrolled in 1952.

Some of Neri's important works are Untitled Standing Figure (1956-1957), College Painting No. 1 (1958-59), etc.

See also 

 Paula Kirkeby, local gallery owner and printing press owner that published and represented Bay Area Figurative Movement artists

References

Sources

Boas, Nancy (2012). David Park: A Painter's Life. Berkeley: University of California. 
Chadwick, Witney (1984). “Narrative Imagism and the Figurative Tradition in Northern California Painting”. Art Journal 45(4), 309.
Falk, Peter Hastings. (1999) Who Was Who in American Art: 1564-1975, Madison, CT: Sound View Press, Vol. I, p. 143.
Gomez, Edward M. (February 5, 1990). “The San Francisco Rebellion”. Time. 
 Jones, Caroline A. (1990) Bay Area Figurative Art: 1950-1965, Berkeley, CA: University of California Press, 
Knight, Christopher (December 15, 1989). “ART REVIEW: Figurative ‘50s Work Whose Time Has Come”. Los Angeles Times.
Landauer, Susan (2000) The Lighter Side of Bay Area Figuration, San Jose, CA: Kemper Museum of Contemporary Art, 
Landauer, Susan (2001). Elmer Bischoff: The Ethics of Paint. Berkeley: University of California. 
Livingston, Jane, John Elderfield (1997). The Art of Richard Diebenkorn. New York: Whitney Museum of American Art, 1997. 
Van Proyen, Mark. "David Park at Hackett-Freedman." Art In America 92, no. 4 (April 2004): 140–141. Art Full Text (H.W. Wilson), EBSCOhost (accessed May 13, 2016).

External links
 "Review/Art: San Francisco Revolution in Style Recalled in a Traveling Exhibition" by Roberta Smith, The New York Times, August 29, 1990. 
 "The Lighter Side of Bay Area Figuration", San Jose Museum of Art, September 3–November 26, 2000.

Artists from California
American art movements
Abstract expressionism
Figurative art
Art in the San Francisco Bay Area